Selectron may refer to one of the following:

 Selectron (particle), the supersymmetric partner of the electron
 Selectron tube, an early form of digital computer memory